Kilner is a surname, and may refer to:

 Andy Kilner (born 1966), former English footballer and manager
 Barron Kilner (1852–1922), English rugby union player
 Ben Kilner (snowboarder) (born 1988), Scottish snowboarder
 Dorothy Kilner (1755–1836), British author of children's books
 Francis Kilner (1851–1921), Anglican suffragan bishop
 John Kilner (born 1952), bioethicist
 John Kilner (1792-1857), founder of the Kilner jar company
 Kevin Kilner (born 1958), American actor
 Norman Kilner (1895–1979), English cricketer
 Rebecca Kilner, British evolutionary biologist
 Roy Kilner (1890–1928), English cricketer
 Walter John Kilner (1847–1920), British doctor who investigated the "aura"

See also
Kilner jar
Kelner
Culbone, a hamlet in Somerset, England sometimes called Kilner